Reppichau is a village and a former municipality in the district of Anhalt-Bitterfeld, in Saxony-Anhalt, Germany. Since 1 January 2010, it is part of the municipality Osternienburger Land. It is the birthplace of Eike of Repgow (Repgow being an older spelling of the name of the village).

Former municipalities in Saxony-Anhalt
Osternienburger Land
Duchy of Anhalt